Stewart's Melville RFC is a rugby union club based in Edinburgh, Scotland. They team competes in Scottish National League Division One, the second tier of Scottish club rugby. Home matches are played at Inverleith; this was the venue for Scotland's home games between 1899 and 1925, during which time the first matches against France and New Zealand were played.

History

The club took on its present form following the merger of Stewart's College FP and Melville College FP in 1973 when the club became known as Stewart's Melville FP RFC.

As the name suggests, many of the players in the club's history were former pupils of the Stewart's Melville College (formed in a merger of Daniel Stewart's College and Melville College) in Edinburgh. This remains the case today, although the club is now 'open' and welcomes players who did not attend the school. 

The 1st XV were coached by Grant MacKenzie, a P.E. teacher who worked at the school, and who died in 2008. 

In June 2014 the club resolved at an AGM to shorten the name to Stewart's Melville RFC.

The club currently run three XVs on a regular basis. The 1st and 2nd XVs both play in competitive national leagues, with the 2nd XV currently in the second division of the reserve leagues. Below this level, the club operate a 'social' 3rd XV which provides rugby for those who just wish to play recreationally.

Club Honours

 Melrose Sevens
 Champions (1): 1979
 Langholm Sevens
 Champions (2): 1979, 1983
 Hawick Sevens
 Champions (2): 1980, 1992
 Gala Sevens
 Champions (2): 1976, 1980
Kelso Sevens
 Champions (1): 1978, 1979
 Jed-Forest Sevens
 Champions (1): 1980
 Selkirk Sevens
 Champions (2): 1976, 1977
Middlesex Sevens 
 Champions (1): 1982
 Edinburgh Northern Sevens
 Champions (1): 2003, 2006

Recent Internationals
Richie Vernon
Ross Rennie
Graham Shiel
Graeme Burns
Dougie Morgan 
Alex Brewster 
Jim Calder
Finlay Calder 
Douglas Wyllie
Ian Forsyth
A.J.W. Hinshelwood
Scott Riddell
George Turner
Ryan Grant
Douglas Wyllie

References
 Massie, Allan A Portrait of Scottish Rugby (Polygon, Edinburgh)

External links

Rugby clubs established in 1973
Scottish rugby union teams
Rugby union in Edinburgh
Sports teams in Edinburgh